Hakan Kurtaş (born 7 September 1988) is a Turkish actor, musician and composer.

Early life 
After completing his education at Bursa Anatolian High School, Kurtaş graduated from Mimar Sinan Fine Arts University State Conservatory Theatre Department. His mother is an economist and his father is a pediatrician. His mother graduated with a degree in economics when he was 3 years old, and then took the final exams again and graduated as an art teacher. He has two younger brothers. Before college, he played basketball in professional clubs. He drew cartoons and made music in his free time. His cartoons were published in Leman and Uykusuz humor and cartoon magazines for a while.

Career 
Kurtaş became interested in theatre while in middle school but decided to become an actor in high school. In 2010, he joined the DOT theatre and was cast in the play Punk Rock. He made his television debut in ATV's series Ezel, portraying the character of "Can Uçar" in the final episode. He had his breakthrough with Kanal D's Bir Çocuk Sevdim (2011–12), portraying the leading role of Sinan Harmangil. In 2012, together with Hatice Aslan, he starred in the movie Vücut playing the character of İzzet Gündoğdu.

In 2012, he joined the DOT theater again to play the role of a boxer in the play Beautiful Burnout/Süpernova, directed by Murat Daltaban. He took boxing lessons in order to prepare for the role. He was then cast in Esme Madra's short film Meşakkat ve Karısı, which was a nominee in the best fictional short film category at the Akbank 9th Short Film Festival. In 2013, together with Ulaş Tuna Astepe and Efe Tunçer, he founded the music band Bir Aralık. Kurtaş is active as a songwriter, composer, guitarist and singer within the band. In 2020, he released a song together with musician Kalben.

Credits

Awards

References

External links 
 
 

Living people
1988 births
Turkish male television actors
Turkish male film actors
Turkish male stage actors